Schoharie, New York may refer to:

Schoharie County, New York
Schoharie (town), New York, located in Schoharie County
Schoharie (village), New York, located within the Town of Schoharie
2018 Schoharie, New York limousine crash

Schoharie, New York